David Alan Campbell (born September 3, 1951) is a former professional baseball pitcher. Campbell pitched two seasons in Major League Baseball for the Atlanta Braves in 1977 and 1978. He appeared in 118 games, all but 14 in relief.

Campbell was signed by the Braves as an amateur free agent in 1974. After two and a half seasons in the minor leagues, Campbell made his major league debut on May 1, 1977, against the Chicago Cubs. He would go on to finish 10th in the National League in saves that year with 13.

In 1978, Campbell finished more games than the previous season, but had just 1 save, and his ERA jumped from 3.05 to 4.80. Also, control proved to be a problem, as he issued 49 walks in 69.1 innings.

The following spring, he was traded to the Montreal Expos for infielder Pepe Frías. He pitched the next three seasons for their top farm club, the Denver Bears, but never returned to the major leagues.

References

External links

Pura Pelota

 
1951 births
Living people
Atlanta Braves players
Baseball players from Indiana
Denver Bears players
East Tennessee State Buccaneers baseball players
East Tennessee State University alumni
Greenwood Braves players
Kingsport Braves players
Major League Baseball pitchers
People from Princeton, Indiana
Richmond Braves players
Savannah Braves players
Tigres de Aragua players
American expatriate baseball players in Venezuela